Shah Alam Circuit (حلبة شاه عالم) or Batu Tiga Speedway Circuit was a racing circuit in Shah Alam, Selangor, Malaysia. The circuit layout was designed by Dutchman John Hugenholtz.

History
The circuit was opened in 1968. The 1968 Malaysian Grand Prix was held there on 8 September as a Formula Libre race and was won by Indonesian Hengkie Irawan driving an Elfin 600.  The circuit was the venue for the Malaysian Grand Prix until 1982, with the starting field consisting alternately of vehicles from the Formula Atlantic, Formula Pacific or Formula 2. The last Malaysian Grand Prix race held in Shah Alam was held for Formula Brabham in 1995.

The circuit was closed in 1977 after an accident that killed six children, although it later reopened after improvements of fences and guard rails around the track were carried out. In the same year, the first international racing event was held. Titled as the 1985 800 km of Selangor, the race was the tenth and final round of the 1985 World Endurance Championship, and was won by Jacky Ickx and Jochen Mass driving a Porsche 962C.

The circuit hosted rounds of the Superbike World Championship in the 1990 and 1991, and from 1991 to 1997 it hosted the Malaysian motorcycle Grand Prix. Mick Doohan is the all-time leader in motorcycle Grand Prix victories at the venue, winning the event four times. The motorcycle Grand Prix was later moved to the Johor Circuit, and later to the Sepang International Circuit.

In 2003 the circuit was sold by Selangor state government to a property developer, which then developed the area into a luxury housing project by the name D'Kayangan.

Details
The Batu Tiga Speedway Circuit Track Details In Brief:
Total Area: 
No. of Pits: 57 units, 42 units concrete pit (22' x 17'), 15 units wooden pits (22' x 7')
Spectator capacity: Covered grandstand - 8000, Uncovered grandstand - 18,000
Track length:  (1968–1984) /  (1985–2003)
No. of Turns: 14. Left -4, Right -10
Straights: 3. The longest straight was 
Gate Entrances: 3

Lap records

The official race lap records at the Shah Alam Circuit are listed as:

In popular culture
The track was used as one of the shooting locations for Jackie Chan's 1995 film Thunderbolt.

See also
 Malaysian Grand Prix
 Mohamed Khir bin Toyo

References

Motorsport venues in Malaysia
Grand Prix motorcycle circuits
Defunct motorsport venues
Shah Alam
Malaysian Grand Prix
Sports venues in Selangor
Sports venues completed in 1968
1968 establishments in Malaysia
2003 disestablishments in Malaysia